{{Album ratings
|rev1 = AllMusic
|rev1score = 
|rev2 = BBC
|rev2score = (favourable)
|rev3 = Classic Rock
|rev3score = 
|rev4 = MusicOMH
|rev4score = <ref name="Music OMH">{{cite web |first=Farah |last=Ishaq |title=Review: Quid Pro Quo |publisher=MusicOMH |url=http://www.musicomh.com/albums/status-quo_0511.htm |date=6 June 2011 |access-date=11 February 2012}}</ref>
}}Quid Pro Quo is the twenty-ninth studio album by English rock band Status Quo, released in May 2011. The album debuted at number 10 in the UK charts and features 14 new songs, as well as the 2010 version of their 1986 hit "In the Army Now" which was re-recorded in support of the Help for Heroes and British Forces Foundation charities. The accompanying Official Live Bootleg'' album features 12 older songs recorded by the band in concert in Amsterdam and Melbourne in 2010. In the UK the album was only available at branches of Tesco stores for its first week before being released conventionally on the band's Fourth Chord label on 6 June 2011.

The single "Rock 'n' Roll 'n' You" was initially released as a free track download from the band's official website, and was included on BBC Radio 2's 'A' playlist from 14 May 2011 onwards. The album was Radio 2's 'Album Of The Week' for the week commencing 28 May 2011. Subsequent singles "Two Way Traffic", "Better Than That" and "The Winner" were also included on the Radio 2 'A' playlist, and "Movin' On" was placed on the Radio 2 'B' playlist.

Track listing
 "Two Way Traffic" (Francis Rossi, John Edwards) – 4:00
 "Rock 'n' Roll 'n' You" (Rossi, Andy Bown) – 3:32
 "Dust to Gold" (Rossi, Bown, Edwards) – 4:52
 "Let's Rock" (Rick Parfitt, Wayne Morris) – 4:28
 "Can't See for Looking" (Parfitt, Bown, Edwards) – 3:55
 "Better Than That" (Rossi, Bob Young) – 3:18
 "Movin' On" (Rossi, Young) – 4:05
 "Leave a Little Light On" (Parfitt, Morris) – 4:05
 "Any Way You Like It" (Bown, Alan Crook, Edwards) – 3:18
 "Frozen Hero" (Rossi, Bown) – 4:21
 "Reality Cheque" (Parfitt, Edwards) – 4:05
 "The Winner" (Rossi, Young) – 3:18
 "It's All About You" (Rossi, Young) – 2:54
 "My Old Ways" (Rossi, Young) – 3:04
 "In the Army Now" (Rob Bolland, Fred Bolland) (UK release only) – 3:53

Official Live Bootleg track listing 
 "Whatever You Want" (Parfitt, Bown) – 5:12
 "Down Down" (Rossi, Young) – 5:06
 "Don't Drive My Car" (Rossi, Bernie Frost) – 3:51
 "Hold You Back" (Rossi, Young, Parfitt) – 4:38
 "Pictures of Matchstick Men" (Rossi) – 2:29
 "Ice in the Sun" (Marty Wilde, Ronnie Scott) – 2:14
 "Beginning of the End" (Rossi, Edwards) – 4:27
 "Roll Over Lay Down" (Rossi, Young, Alan Lancaster, Parfitt, John Coghlan) – 5:58
 "Caroline" (Rossi, Young) – 5:08
 "Rockin' All Over the World" (John Cameron Fogerty) – 4:07

Deluxe Edition bonus tracks
"Paper Plane" (Rossi, Young) – 3:38
"Softer Ride" (Lancaster, Parfitt) – 3:46

Personnel
Francis Rossi - vocals, lead guitar
Rick Parfitt - vocals, guitar
John Edwards - bass, vocals
Andy Bown - keyboards
Matt Letley - drums

Additional personnel
Bob Young - harmonica on track 13
Nick Rossi - backing vocals on tracks 2, 6, 7, 12–14
Kick Horns - horns on track 4
Simon Clarke - baritone sax
Paul Spong - trumpet
Tim Sanders - tenor sax
Corps of Army Music, Kneller Hall, Twickenham and the voice of WO Eliott Drake on track 15
Recorded at ARSIS Studios 2010-2011

Charts

Certifications

References

Quid Pro Quo
2011 albums
Albums produced by Mike Paxman